Russell Ayto is an English illustrator of children's books including many picture books.

Biography
He was born in Chichester, Sussex in 1960 and grew up in Kidlington, Oxfordshire. After school he worked in the Histopathology Department of the John Radcliffe Hospital before studying at Oxford Polytechnic and Exeter College of Art and Design where he gained a degree in Graphic Design. He gained work with Observer Magazine and Time Out and began illustrating adult fiction before his work was spotted by Walker Books and he moved to illustrating  children's fiction. He currently lives with his family in Penzance, Cornwall.

Recognition
 2001 shortlist, Kate Greenaway Medal (for illustration); The Witch's Children by Ursula Jones
 2003 Nestlé Smarties Book Prize, ages 0–5; The Witch's Children and the Queen by Ursula Jones
 2004 shortlist, Greenaway Medal; One More Sheep by Mij Kelly
 2008 shortlist, Booktrust Early Years Award, Pre-school; The Cow That Laid an Egg by Andy Cutbill
 2008 Roald Dahl Funny Prize, ages 0–6; The Witch's Children go to School by Ursula Jones
 2014 Honor, Irma Black Award

Works

Adult cover art
Oxford Coffee Houses, 1651–1800 by Norma Albertin-Potter and Alyx Bennett (Hampden, 1987)
Why Are We in Vietnam? by Norman Mailer, later edition (Oxford University Press, 1988) 
Fludd by Hilary Mantel, first edition (Viking Press, 1989)

Children's books as writer
The Other Day I Met a Bear, self-illustrated, Walker Books, 2001

Children's books as illustrator

1990s

2000s

2010s
The Love Bugs by Simon Puttock, HarperCollins, 2010
Captain Flinn and the Pirate Dinosaurs – Smugglers Bay! by Giles Andreas, Puffin, 2010
First Week at Cow School by Andy Cutbill, HarperCollins, 2011

References

External links
 

1960 births
English children's book illustrators
English illustrators
English children's writers
Alumni of Oxford Brookes University
People from Chichester
People from Kidlington
People from Penzance
Living people